The solar neutrino unit (SNU) is a unit of Solar neutrino flux widely used in neutrino astronomy and radiochemical neutrino experiments. It is equal to the neutrino flux producing 10−36 captures per target atom per second. It is convenient given the very low event rates in radiochemical experiments. Typical rate is expected to be from tens SNU to hundred SNU.

There are two ways of detecting solar neutrinos: radiochemical and real time experiments. The principle of radiochemical experiments is the reaction of the form

.

The daughter nucleus's decay is used in the detection. Production rate of the daughter nucleus is given by
,
where

  is the solar neutrino flux
  is the cross section for the radiochemical reaction
  is the number of target atoms.

With typical neutrino flux of 1010 cm−2 s−1 and a typical interaction cross section of about 10−45 cm2, about 1030 target atoms are required to produce one event per day. Taking into account that 1 mole is equal to 6.022 atoms, this number corresponds to ktons of the target substances, whereas present neutrino detectors operate at much lower quantities of those.

See also
Neutrino
Neutrino detector
Mole (unit)
Solar neutrino
Terrestrial Neutrino Units (TNU)

Links

References

Units of frequency